

O 

 
 
 
 
 
 
 
 
 
 
 9524 O'Rourke
 
 
 
 
 
 
 
 
 
 
 
 
 
 
 
 
 
 
 
 
 
 
 
 
 
 
 
 
 
 
 
 
 
 224 Oceana
 
 
 
 
 
 
 
 475 Ocllo
 598 Octavia
 
 
 1144 Oda
 
 
 
 
 
 
 2606 Odessa
 
 
 
 
 
 1143 Odysseus
 
 
 
 
 215 Oenone
 
 
 
 
 
 
 
 
 
 
 
 
 
 
 
 
 
 
 7476 Ogilsbie
 
 
 
 
 
 
 
 
 
 1259 Ógyalla
 
 
 439 Ohio
 
 
 
 
 
 
 
 
 
 
 
 
 
 
 
 
 
 7526 Ohtsuka
 
 
 
 
 
 
 
 
 
 
 
 
 5080 Oja
 
 
 
 
 
 
 
 
 
 
 6244 Okamoto
 
 
 
 
 
 
 
 
 
 
 
 
 
 
 
 
 
 
 
 
 
 
 
 
 
 
 
 
 
 52872 Okyrhoe
 
 
 
 
 
 
 
 
 
 1002 Olbersia
 
 
 5656 Oldfield
 
 
 
 
 
 
 
 
 
 
 
 
 
 
 304 Olga
 
 
 
 
 
 
 
 
 
 
 
 
 
 
 
 
 
 
 
 
 835 Olivia
 
 
 
 
 2201 Oljato
 
 
 
 
 
 
 
 
 
 582 Olympia
 1022 Olympiada
 
 
 
 
 
 
 
 
 
 
 
 
 3406 Omsk
 
 
 7204 Ondřejov
 
 
 
 
 
 
 
 
 1389 Onnie
 
 
 
 
 
 
 
 
 
 
 
 
 1691 Oort
 
 
 
 
 
 
 
 
 171 Ophelia
 2099 Öpik
 
 
 
 255 Oppavia
 
 
 39382 Opportunity
 
 
 1195 Orangia
 
 
 
 
 
 1080 Orchis
 
 90482 Orcus
 
 
 
 
 
 
 
 
 
 
 
 701 Oriola
 
 
 
 
 
 
 
 
 
 
 
 350 Ornamenta
 
 
 
 
 
 3361 Orpheus
 5284 Orsilocus
 
 
 
 
 
 
 
 
 
 551 Ortrud
 2043 Ortutay
 
 21900 Orus
 
 11020 Orwell
 
 
 
 
 
 
 
 
 
 
 
 5592 Oshima
 
 
 
 
 1923 Osiris
 1837 Osita
 750 Oskar
 
 
 
 
 
 1369 Ostanina
 
 
 343 Ostara
 
 1207 Ostenia
 
 
 
 
 
 
 
 
 
 3169 Ostro
 
 
 
 
 
 
 
 9844 Otani
 
 
 
 
 
 
 
 1529 Oterma
 1126 Otero
 
 
 913 Otila
 
 
 
 385571 Otrera
 
 670 Ottegebe
 994 Otthild
 
 401 Ottilia
 
 
 
 2227 Otto Struve
 
 
 
 
 
 
 
 
 
 
 
 
 1512 Oulu
 
 1473 Ounas
 
 
 
 
 
 
 
 
 
 
 
 
 2648 Owa

See also 
 List of minor planet discoverers
 List of observatory codes

References 
 

Lists of minor planets by name